Jakub Przygoński (born 24 March 1985) is a Polish racing driver. As a rally raid driver, he won the FIA World Cup for Cross-Country Rallies in 2018. In addition to racing in rally raids, he has raced in other disciplines, especially motorcycling, such as motocross and enduro. He has also competed in drifting competitions, having won the bronze medal at 2022 FIA Motorsport Games in drifting.

References

1985 births
Living people
Sportspeople from Warsaw
Polish motorcycle racers
Polish rally drivers
Dakar Rally drivers
Dakar Rally motorcyclists
Off-road motorcycle racers
FIA Motorsport Games drivers
21st-century Polish people